Luke Jackson (born 29 September 2001) is an Australian rules footballer who plays for the Fremantle Football Club in the Australian Football League (AFL), having previously played for the Melbourne Football Club.

Early basketball
In 2018, Jackson represented Australia at the Under-17 FIBA Basketball World Cup in Argentina and won gold at the Under-16 FIBA Asia Championship in China. He was named in the all-tournament team for the U16 Asian Championship. The AIS basketball program was keen for him to move to Canberra in 2019 and begin a pathway which could have led him to college in the United States. He was childhood friends with NBA draft pick Luke Travers.

Early football
Jackson represented Western Australia at the AFL Under 18 Championships for two seasons, where he ended up winning under-18 All Australian selection. He also played for the East Fremantle Sharks for the 2019 season in the colts division.

AFL career
Jackson was recruited by Melbourne with pick 3 in the 2019 AFL draft. Jackson debuted in the Demons' one-point win over the Carlton Blues in the second round of the 2020 AFL season. He collected 7 disposals, 1 behind and 1 tackle. After being omitted for the next 3 rounds, Jackson re-entered the team in Round 7. He won  the Rising Star nomination for Round 10. In that game he kicked 2 goals, including the opening goal. On top of that, he also collected 8 disposals, 14 hitouts and 2 marks. At the conclusion of the year he took out the Harold Ball Memorial Trophy, an award given to the best young talent for the Melbourne Demons. Jackson re-signed for a one year contract extension with the club at the end of the year, keeping him at the club until 2022. 

Jackson became a part of a select few players in the AFL to receive two Rising Star nominations in their careers after he received a 2021 AFL Rising Star nomination for his 22 disposal, 1 goal performance in Round 7 of the 2021 AFL season, and won the award overall at the season's conclusion. Jackson was a part of Melbourne's 57 year drought breaking Grand Final victory over the Western Bulldogs.

Following Melbourne's loss to the Brisbane Lions in the 2022 semi-final, Jackson reportedly met with the club and formally requested a trade to his home state of Western Australia, however he did not nominate a specific club and allowed offers from both West Coast and Fremantle. Jackson was traded to Fremantle on October 10 for a first-round pick, a future first-round pick and a future second-round pick.

Statistics
Updated to the end of the 2022 season.

|-
| 2020 ||  || 6
| 6 || 3 || 2 || 19 || 33 || 52 || 9 || 8 || 29 || 0.5 || 0.3 || 3.1 || 5.5 || 8.7 || 1.5 || 1.3 || 4.8 || 0
|-
| scope=row bgcolor=F0E68C | 2021# ||  || 6
| 24 || 16 || 9 || 107 || 201 || 308 || 72 || 48 || 255 || 0.7 || 0.4 || 4.5 || 8.4 || 12.8 || 3.0 || 2.0 || 10.6 || 3
|-
| 2022 ||  || 6
| 22 || 11 || 12 || 118 || 185 || 303 || 65 || 81 || 243 || 0.5 || 0.5 || 5.4 || 8.4 || 13.8 || 3.0 || 3.7 || 11.0 || 2
|- class=sortbottom
! colspan=3 | Career
! 52 !! 30 !! 23 !! 244 !! 419 !! 663 !! 146 !! 137 !! 527 !! 0.6 !! 0.4 !! 4.7 !! 8.1 !! 12.8 !! 2.8 !! 2.6 !! 10.1 !! 5
|}

Honours and achievements
Team
 AFL premiership player: 2021
 McClelland Trophy: 2021

Individual
 AFL Rising Star nominee: 2020 (Round 10)
 Harold Ball Memorial Trophy: 2020
 22under22 team: 2021
 AFL Rising Star: 2021

References

External links

2001 births
Living people
Melbourne Football Club players
Australian rules footballers from Western Australia
East Fremantle Football Club players
Melbourne Football Club Premiership players
One-time VFL/AFL Premiership players
Australian people of New Zealand descent